Edward Tappenden (1876-1944), was an English bowls player who competed at the British Empire Games.

Bowls career
He participated in the 1938 British Empire Games at Sydney in the fours/rinks event and finished in fifth place.

Personal life
He was a private secretary by trade and lived in Wood Green, after marrying Violet Milne, they lived at The Avenue in Hitchin.

References

English male bowls players
Bowls players at the 1938 British Empire Games
1876 births
1944 deaths
Commonwealth Games competitors for England